Josephs Mills is an unincorporated community in Tyler County, West Virginia, United States. It was the birthplace for Cecil H. Underwood, who was the Governor of West Virginia from 1957 to 1961, and from 1997 to 2001.

References

Unincorporated communities in Tyler County, West Virginia
Unincorporated communities in West Virginia
Tyler County, West Virginia